Ovidiu Stoianof (born 28 June 1985) is a Romanian footballer, who plays as a striker for Liga III side Gloria Bistrița-Năsăud. In his career, Stoianof also played for teams such as Callatis Mangalia, FC U Craiova, Universitatea Cluj, ALRO Slatina or Farul Constanța, among others.

External links
 
 

1985 births
Living people
Sportspeople from Constanța
Romanian footballers
Association football forwards
Liga I players
Liga II players
FC Callatis Mangalia players
FC U Craiova 1948 players
ASC Daco-Getica București players
FC Universitatea Cluj players
FC Internațional Curtea de Argeș players
FCV Farul Constanța players
Sepsi OSK Sfântu Gheorghe players
CS Gloria Bistrița-Năsăud footballers